Milan Vilotić (born 21 October 1986) is a Serbian former professional footballer who played as centre-back.

Club career

Čukarički
Born in Belgrade, Vilotić first played professional football with Čukarički from the age of 18. He played over 80 matches for Čukarički from 2004, debuting with one of the best generation of Čukarički players which included Miloš Ninković.

Red Star Belgrade
In summer 2009 he transferred to Red Star Belgrade. In 2010, however, he was diagnosed with a potentially life-threatening condition and missed half of the 2010–11 season. After the second half of the season, Vilotić was showing promising potential and was promoted to captain of Red Star for a brief period in the 2011 summer off-season. However, at the half-time of a friendly match with F.C. Ashdod, Red Star coach Robert Prosinečki got upset at Vilotić and said in a subsequent conference that he was demoted from being Red Star's captain. By late November 2011, he was also openly accused in the media by his teammate Cristian Borja of creating a bad atmosphere in the squad with the intention of sabotaging the foreign players that were playing in Red Star at the time.

Grasshoppers
In July 2012, Vilotić signed with Grasshopper Club Zürich on a bosman move. He quickly became the team's most reliable centre-back and scored a penalty after over-time in the 2013 Schweizer Cup Final.

Young Boys
On 31 January 2014, Vilotić moved to the league rivals BSC Young Boys, ending a two-year playing spell with Grasshopper.

International career
Milan was part of the 2009 UEFA European Under-21 Football Championship Serbian squad and has played for the Serbia national under-21 football team. In April 2010 national team coach Radomir Antić selected him in Serbia squad for a friendly match against Japan in Osaka, but Vilotić failed to debut due to stomach problems. In May 2011, he received another call up and played his first game in a Serbia jersey against Australia. In November 2013 Vilotić showed interest in playing for Montenegro on international level.

Illness
In August 2010, after a medical screening he has been diagnosed with a malignant tumor on right scapula that had threatened to end his playing career. After a surgical intervention in Bologna, and a period of recovery, during which he had the undivided support of the public in Serbia, in January 2011 doctors confirmed that he could play professional football again.

Career statistics

Club

Honours

Club
Red Star
 Serbian Cup (2): 2009–10, 2011–12

Grasshoppers
 Swiss Cup: 2012–13

Individual
 Serbian SuperLiga Team of the Season''': 2009–10 (with Red Star)

References

External links
Milan Vilotić Stats at Utakmica.rs
 Vilotić potpisao trogodišnji ugovor sa Zvezdom at danas.rs
 Milan Vilotić teško bolestan at b92
 Vilotić ujedinio zvezdaše i partizanovce at sportal.rs
 Vilotić se vraća at sportal.rs
 Vilotić ponovo na terenu at blic.rs
 Počele pripreme JSL selekcije at b92
 Vilotić: "Japan me više neće videti" at sportske.net
 Vilotić debituje za Srbiju at mondo.rs
 

Living people
1986 births
Footballers from Belgrade
Association football defenders
Serbian footballers
Serbia international footballers
FK Čukarički players
Red Star Belgrade footballers
Grasshopper Club Zürich players
BSC Young Boys players
FC St. Gallen players
Serbian SuperLiga players
Swiss Super League players
Serbian expatriate footballers
Expatriate footballers in Switzerland
Serbia under-21 international footballers